UFC on ABC: Vettori vs. Holland  (also known as UFC on ABC 2 and UFC Vegas 23) was a mixed martial arts event produced by the Ultimate Fighting Championship that took place on April 10, 2021 at the UFC Apex facility in Enterprise, Nevada, part of the Las Vegas Metropolitan Area, United States.

Background
This was the first event to feature Venum as the new UFC's official uniform partner. The promotion had previously been partnered with Reebok since 2014, before signing a deal with Venum in July 2020 that would be made effective April 2021.

A middleweight bout between former UFC Welterweight Championship challenger Darren Till and Marvin Vettori was expected to serve as the event headliner. However, Till withdrew from the fight on March 30 due to a broken collarbone. It was announced on April 1 that Kevin Holland would step in on 9 days notice to face Vettori. By making his second main event appearance in three weeks, Holland tied the record for shortest turnaround between two main events.

A middleweight bout between Zak Cummings and Sam Alvey was expected to take place at the event. However, Cummings withdrew from the bout on March 11 due to undisclosed reasons and was replaced by Julian Marquez.

A light heavyweight bout between Shamil Gamzatov and Da Un Jung was scheduled for the preliminary portion of the card. However, Gamzatov was removed from the bout on March 24 due to alleged visa issues and replaced by William Knight.

Bea Malecki was expected to face Norma Dumont in a women's bantamweight bout at this event. However, Malecki pulled out a week before the contest due to undisclosed reasons and was replaced by promotional newcomer Erin Blanchfield.

A middleweight bout between Kyle Daukaus and Aliaskhab Khizriev was expected to take place at the event. However, the bout was pulled from the card on April 7 due to COVID-19 protocols.

At the weigh-ins, Ignacio Bahamondes and Norma Dumont missed weight for the respective bouts. Bahamondes weighed in at 156.75 pounds, three quarters of a pound over the lightweight non-title fight limit. His bout proceeded at a catchweight and he was fined 20% of his individual purse, which went to his opponent John Makdessi. Dumont weighed in at 139.5 pounds, three and a half pounds over the women's bantamweight non-title fight limit. Her bout with Blanchfield was cancelled by the Nevada State Athletic Commission.

Results

Bonus awards
The following fighters received $50,000 bonuses.
Fight of the Night: Julian Marquez vs. Sam Alvey
Performance of the Night: Mackenzie Dern and Mateusz Gamrot

See also 

 List of UFC events
 List of current UFC fighters
 2021 in UFC

References 

UFC on ABC
Mixed martial arts in Las Vegas
Sports competitions in Las Vegas
2021 in sports in Nevada
2021 in mixed martial arts
April 2021 sports events in the United States